Las 4 Estaciones del Amor (English: "The 4 Seasons of Love") is the first extended play (EP) by Mexican recording artist Natalia Lafourcade, released on 2007 in Mexico, and United States on January 22, 2008.

Background

The project started when the end of 2006 Natalia Lafourcade is separated from her band "The Forquetina" and settled for nine months in Canada. There she began work on a new project that included the writing and recording a demo for a new CD which would have the distinction of being purely instrumental. The final product was an EP, which defines itself as a "disk Natalia Pop-Symphony", called "The 4 Seasons Of Love", which in turn was a result from her failed relationship with a member of her band. The same was recorded in Mexico in 2007 with the collaboration of the National Youth Orchestra of Veracruz. The EP has a duration of 28 minutes and consists of four movements: Summer, Fall, Winter and Spring, respectively.

Track listing

References

Natalia Lafourcade albums
2008 EPs
Sony Music EPs
Rock en Español EPs